The Cybersecurity, Information Protection, and Hardware Evaluation Research Laboratory (CIPHER) is one of eight labs in the Georgia Tech Research Institute. It was created on October 1, 2010 and focuses on cyber security. Along with the GTRI Information and Communications Laboratory, it is part of the Information and Cyber Sciences directorate. GTRI CIPHER is known for its commitment to Open Source Software It will feature existing business areas such as secure information systems and resilient command and control with emerging areas such as cyberwarfare. The laboratory will additionally be a part of the Georgia Tech Information Security Center.

References

External links
 CIPHER official website

CIPHER
Computer security organizations